The Fall of the Rebel Angels may refer to:

Paintings 
 The Fall of the Rebel Angels, Peter Bruegel the Elder, 1562
 The Fall of the Rebel Angels (Giordano), c. 1666
 The Fall of the Rebel Angels (Floris), 1554
 The Fall of the Damned, Rubens, c. 1620

Film 
 The Fall of the Rebel Angels (film)

See also 
 Fall of the Damned (disambiguation)
 The Fall of a Rebel Angel, 2016 album by Enigma